Marie-Aurore-Lucienne Gagnon, simply known as Aurore Gagnon (31 May 1909 – 12 February 1920), was a Canadian girl who was a victim of child abuse. She died of exhaustion and blood poisoning from some 52 wounds inflicted by her stepmother, Marie-Anne Houde, and her father, Télesphore Gagnon. The story of l'enfant martyre (English translation: The Child Martyr) received great attention in the media and Aurore became an icon of Quebec sociological and popular culture.

Life
Gagnon was born into and raised in a Roman Catholic family. She was the second of five children of farmer Télesphore Gagnon and his first wife Marie-Anne Caron, whom he had married in September 1906. They lived in Fortierville, Quebec, a small village on the south shore of the St. Lawrence River, 100 kilometers southwest of Quebec City. The Gagnons' first child, Marie-Jeanne, was born in August 1907. Aurore's birth was quickly followed by that of Lucina, then Georges-Étienne in 1910 and Joseph in 1915.

In 1916, not long after Joseph's birth, Marie-Anne Caron was hospitalized for tuberculosis. Marie-Anne Houde, the widow of a cousin of Télesphore, soon moved into the Gagnon home, saying that she wanted to "take care of the house and children." She was a 30-something-year-old mother of two sons, Gérard and Henri-Georges. She was born in Sainte-Sophie-de-Lévrard, a neighbouring municipality of Fortierville, Quebec.

On 6 November 1917, two-year-old Joseph was found dead in his bed; a coroner's inquest deemed it a natural death.
 
On 23 January 1918, Marie-Anne Caron died of her illness at the Beauport Asylum. Since Télesphore could not take care of the farm and his children all by himself, he married Houde in a private ceremony the following week.

The Gagnon children went to live with their grandparents for a few months in Leclercville, another neighbouring municipality. The children returned to their father's home in the summer of 1919; it was then that Aurore began to be abused. Houde did not abuse her stepdaughter only physically; several eyewitnesses testified that she had once tried to poison Aurore by urging her to drink detergent. 

In September 1919, 10-year-old Aurore was hospitalized for more than a month at the Hôtel-Dieu de Québec with a severe leg infection that was caused by her stepmother branding her with a metal poker. Upon her release, the beatings resumed.

Death
Aurore died on 12 February 1920. Her autopsy was conducted in the church sacristy by Dr. Albert Marois, who noticed around 54 wounds all over her body. The wounds were a result of several blows administered over time. The most severe wound was located on the side of Aurore's skull. Her scalp was caked in dried blood and pus, and her left thigh was swollen. The skin on her hands and wrists had been ripped off down to the bone.

Aurore Gagnon's funeral took place on 14 February 1920; the Mass was led by Fr. Ferdinand Massé. After the funeral, Télesphore and Houde were arrested and charged with killing Aurore.

Houde was convicted of murder and sentenced to death. Although the jury did not recommend mercy, her sentence was commuted to life in prison. Houde was paroled on health grounds on 3 July 1935. She died of breast and brain cancer on 12 May 1936, at age 46.

Télesphore was convicted of manslaughter and sentenced to life in prison. The jury decided not to convict him of murder since they thought that his wife had manipulated him into abusing his daughter. Télesphore was paroled in 1925, on the grounds of good behaviour. He also had a throat tumor, which doctors thought would kill him within a few months. However, Télesphore survived and returned to his hometown and previous life. He wrote several letters to Marie-Anne Houde, who was still in prison. After her death, Télesphore remarried. He died on 30 August 1961, at age 78.

Télesphore spent most of the remainder of his life in obscurity. However, his name returned to the public spotlight because of an upcoming film about the case. Télesphore and his family unsuccessfully tried to stop the release of the film on the grounds that it would damage their reputation.

Aurore's older sister Marie-Jeanne died in Shawinigan in 1986.

In popular culture
Aurore Gagnon remains a popular cultural icon in Quebec, with almost mythical status.

1921 play
The trials attracted significant attention from the public, and dozens of people had to be turned away at every hearing. The press coverage of the case inspired two actors, Henri Rollin and Léon Petitjean, to write a play titled Aurore, l'enfant martyre (Aurore, the Child Martyr).

The play premiered on 21 January 1921 at the Théâtre Alcazar in Montreal; it was a smash hit. After having performed the play at five other Montreal theatres, the cast and crew toured all of Quebec and also performed in Ontario and the seaside provinces. In the span of 25 years, the play was performed over 6,000 times and was seen by about 180,000 people.

The following actresses took turns playing Marie-Anne Houde: Amanda d'Estrée, Germaine Germain, Nana de Varennes, Rose Rey-Duzil, Henriette Berthier, and Lucie Mitchell. The role of Aurore was most often played by Thérèse McKinnon.

1950 film
In 1950, the success of the play could still be felt; this inspired producers of the Alliance cinématographique canadienne to make a film about Aurore Gagnon's life. Jean-Yves Bigras was hired to direct the film.

Filming took place during the summer of 1951 in Sainte-Dorothée, a small municipality on the Île Jésus in northern Montreal. Lucie Mitchell reprised her role as Marie-Anne Houde, whereas Paul Desmarteaux played Télesphore Gagnon. Thérèse McKinnon, who had played Aurore on stage, ended up playing Marie-Anne Caron, Aurore's biological mother, in the film. The role of Aurore was played by Yvonne Laflamme.

The film was slated to be released in the fall of 1951, but Télesphore Gagnon tried to obtain an injunction to prevent this. The Court ruled in favour of the producers, citing, among other things, the fact that Télesphore had never objected to the release of the play in 1921.

The film, titled La petite Aurore: l'enfant martyre, premiered on 25 April 1952 at the Théâtre Saint-Denis. It was sold out for the first few weeks of its release, which was a first for a Québécois film. The film would later be dubbed into eight languages.

1984 play
A remake of the play,  titled simply Aurore, was performed in 1984. This remake was directed by René Richard Cyr and starred Adèle Reinhardt as Aurore and Louison Danis as her stepmother.

2005 film
In 2004, a new film about Aurore Gagnon was announced; it was produced by Denise Robert and directed by Luc Dionne. In September of that year, about 10,000 child actresses auditioned for the role of Aurore; the role eventually went to Marianne Fortier, who was ten years old at the time.

The film was released on 8 July 2005. Acting alongside Fortier were Serge Postigo as Télesphore Gagnon, Hélène Bourgeois-Leclerc as Marie-Anne Houde, Sarah-Jeanne Labrosse as Marie-Jeanne Gagnon, Yves Jacques as Father Antoine Leduc, and Rémy Girard as Justice of the Peace Oréus Mailhot. Like the 1951 film, the 2005 film was a box office hit, making a total of CA$972,582 during the first weekend of showings; at the time, this was a summer record for a Québécois film.

The 2005 film is noteworthy for implying that the village priest, Ferdinand Massé (named Antoine Leduc in the film), was complicit in Aurore's death, which is false. In the film, Leduc repeatedly claims that Aurore is a difficult child as well as a compulsive liar; he also dismisses other villagers' concerns for Aurore and even discourages them from intervening.

Other developments
The case of Aurore Gagnon is well-documented in the historic literature of Quebec. Many still consider her case to be a turning point for children's rights in Quebec and even in all of Canada. Indeed, the case helped to spark public interest in the realities of domestic violence and child abuse. Many Quebecers think of Aurore's death as a reminder that silence in the face of injustice often does more harm than good.

On 7 December 2015, the town of Fortierville recognized Aurore as a historical figure (French: personnage historique).

See also
Cinderella effect
Child murder

References

External links
Biography at the Dictionary of Canadian Biography Online
Aurore! The Mystery of the Martyred Child – Great Unsolved Mysteries in Canadian History
Genealogy of Aurore Gagnon

1909 births
1920 deaths
20th-century Canadian people
20th-century Canadian women
1920 murders in Canada
Child abuse resulting in death
Deaths from sepsis
Female murder victims
French Quebecers
Infectious disease deaths in Quebec
Murdered Canadian children
People from Centre-du-Québec
People murdered in Quebec
Incidents of violence against girls